John Munro may refer to:

Political figures 
 J. B. Munro (1936–2018), New Zealand politician, represented Invercargill electorate
 John Farquhar Munro (1934–2014), Scottish Liberal Democrat MSP
 John Munro (Canadian politician) (1931–2003), Canadian Member of Parliament and cabinet minister
 John Munro (New Zealand politician born 1839) (1839–1910), New Zealand politician, represented Buller electorate
 John W. Munro (fl. 1900s), Scottish-born Canadian politician
 John Munro (New Zealand politician born c. 1798) (c. 1798–1879), New Zealand politician, represented Marsden electorate
 John Munro (loyalist) (1728–1800), United Empire Loyalist and political figure in Upper Canada
 Sir John Munro, 4th Baronet (died 1697), Scottish baronet
 John Munro, 11th Baron of Foulis (died 1491), Scottish clan chief of the highland Clan Munro in Rosshire, Scotland

Writers 
 John Munro (poet) (1889–1918), Scottish soldier and poet
 John Munro (author) (1849–1930), English author whose A Trip to Venus was excerpted in Farewell Fantastic Venus
 John Neil Munro (fl. 1990s), Scottish journalist and author of biographies

Others 
 John Munro (sportsman) (1928–2013), Western Australian cricketer and WAFL player
 Arthur Munro (John Arthur Ruskin Munro, 1864–1944), rector of Lincoln College, Oxford, 1919–44
 John Munro, 9th of Teaninich (1778–1858), Scottish soldier and statesman in India
 John Munro, 4th of Newmore (died 1749), Scottish-British military officer
 John Munro of Tain (died 1630), Scottish Presbyterian minister
 John Campbell Munro (born 1947), Scottish-born Australian folk musician
 John Munro (surgeon) (1670–1740), Scottish surgeon
 Les Munro (John Leslie Munro, 1919–2015), New Zealand "Dambuster" Air Force pilot
 John Hay Munro (born 1948), pastor of Calvary Church, Charlotte, North Carolina
 John M. M. Munro (1853–1925), Scottish businessman and electrical engineer
 John Munro of Lemlair, Scottish soldier
 John C. Munro (clipper), an iron full-rigged ship built in 1862

See also
 John Munroe (1796–1861), United States soldier and military governor of New Mexico
 John H. Munroe (1820–1885), Ontario real estate agent and political figure
 John Monroe (disambiguation)
 John Monro (disambiguation)